The 1975 Hardie-Ferodo 1000 was the 16th running of the Bathurst 1000 touring car race. It was an endurance race for touring cars complying with CAMS Group C regulations. The event was held at the Mount Panorama Circuit just outside Bathurst, New South Wales on 5 October 1975 over a distance of 1006.036 km (163 laps × 6.172 km). The race was Round 3 of the 1975 Australian Manufacturers' Championship.

The race was won by Peter Brock, his second win, and Brian Sampson for his only Bathurst 1000 win. The pair drove their Gown - Hindhaugh entered Holden LH Torana SL/R 5000 L34 to a two-lap victory, avenging the previous year's result when the pair built up a record six-lap lead before suffering terminal engine failure on lap 118 with Brock at the wheel. Another dealership entered L34 Torana, the Ron Hodgson Motors car of Bob Morris and Frank Gardner, finished second with the Holden Dealer Team L34 Torana of Colin Bond and Johnnie Walker completing a clean sweep of the top three places for Holden.

Class structure
Cars competed in four classes, defined by engine capacity:

Class A
The smallest class was for under 1300cc engine capacity. It was made up of Alfa Romeo GT Junior, Datsun 1200, Ford Escort, Honda Civic, Mazda 1300, Morris Cooper S, Toyota Corolla and Volkswagen Passat.

Class B
The under two litre class saw a mix of Alfa Romeo 2000 GTV, BMW 2002, Ford Escort RS2000, Mazda RX-3 and Triumph Dolomite.

Class C
The under three litre class featured Datsun 260Z, Ford Capri, Mazda RX-3 and Mercedes-Benz 280E.

Class D
For cars over three litres of engine capacity, the class consisted only of Holden Torana and Ford Falcon.

Top 10 Qualifiers

Final results
Final results were as follows:

Statistics
 Pole Position - #2 Colin Bond - 2:27.4
 Fastest Lap - N/A
 Average Speed - 140 km/h
 Race Time - 7:10:11.3

References

 Australian Competition Yearbook, 1976 Edition
 Australia's Greatest Motor Race, 1960–1989
 Australia's Greatest Motor Race, The Complete History, © 1981
 CAMS Manual of Motor Sport, 1975
 Hardie-Ferodo Bathurst 1000, The First 15 Years
 Official Programme, Hardie Ferodo 1000, Bathurst, 5 October 1975
 The Australian Racing History of Ford, © 1989
 The Official Racing History of Holden, © 1988

External links
 CAMS Manual reference to Australian titles
 www.touringcarracing.net
 race results

Motorsport in Bathurst, New South Wales
Hardie-Ferodo 1000